Carole L. Menig-Peterson  (born 1942) is an American–Canadian child psychologist. She is a professor at Memorial University of Newfoundland who specializes in early childhood memory. In 2012, Peterson was elected a Fellow of the Royal Society of Canada for pioneering narrative ability, eyewitness memory, and early childhood amnesia.

Early life and education
Peterson was born in 1942. As an undergraduate student at the University of Washington, Peterson was named a National Merit Finalist. Upon graduating, she enrolled at the University of Minnesota for her PhD.

Career
Following her PhD in 1974, Peterson spent over a decade outside of academia before accepting a faculty position at Memorial University of Newfoundland (MUN) in 1991. Her research at MUN heavily focused on children’s development of narrative skills and children’s memory. In 2012, she was elected a Fellow of the Royal Society of Canada for pioneering narrative ability, eyewitness memory, and early childhood amnesia. Peterson continued to conduct research on childhood memory as it pertains to the legal system. In 2016, she received a grant to lead a five-year study titled "Assessing Interviews and Recall in Children." The aim of the study was to improve children's credibility as witnesses. In 2021, Peterson revealed that one's earliest memories could date back to when they were two-and-a-half years old, despite most people placing their earliest memories as happening at three-and-a-half to four years old.

References

External links

Living people
1942 births
Place of birth missing (living people)
Canadian women psychologists
University of Washington alumni
University of Minnesota alumni
Academic staff of the Memorial University of Newfoundland
Fellows of the Royal Society of Canada